Benton Township is an inactive township in Crawford County, in the U.S. state of Missouri.

Benton Township most likely was named after Thomas Hart Benton, a state legislator.

References

Townships in Missouri
Townships in Crawford County, Missouri